Trasadingen is a municipality in the canton of Schaffhausen in Switzerland.

Geography

Of this area, 76.3% is used for agricultural purposes, while 12.2% is forested. Of the rest of the land, 11% is settled (buildings or roads) and the remainder (0.5%) is non-productive (rivers or lakes).

Coat of arms
The blazon of the municipal coat of arms is Argent, a Vine Vert fructed Azure issuant from a Cross pattee of the second and in chief dexter a Cross pattee Sable and sinister a Sickle proper.

Demographics
Trasadingen has a population of 585, of which 13.7% are foreign nationals.  Of the foreign population,, 61.7% are from Germany, 23.5% are from Italy, 1.2% are from Turkey, and 13.6% are from another country.  Over the last 10 years the population has grown at a rate of 2.6%.  Most of the population speaks German (96.8%), with Italian being second most common ( 0.8%) and English being third ( 0.4%).

The age distribution of the population is children and teenagers (0–19 years old) make up 23.8% of the population, while adults (20–64 years old) make up 59.1% and seniors (over 64 years old) make up 17.1%.

In the 2007 federal election the most popular party was the SVP which received 46.6% of the vote.  The next two most popular parties were the SP (28.4%), and the FDP (25%) .

In Trasadingen about 83.5% of the population (between age 25–64) have completed either non-mandatory upper secondary education or additional higher education (either university or a Fachhochschule).  In Trasadingen, 1.72% of the population attend kindergarten or another pre-school, 5.66% attend a Primary School, 3.95% attend a lower level Secondary School, and 2.23% attend a higher level Secondary School.

, 21.7% of the population belonged to the Roman Catholic Church and 61.7% belonged to the Swiss Reformed Church.

The historical population is given in the following table:

Transportation
There is a border crossing into Germany at Trasadingen town with Erzingen in Klettgau municipality, Baden-Württemberg state.

Economy
Trasadingen has an unemployment rate of 1.82%.  , there were 61 people employed in the primary economic sector and about 23 businesses involved in this sector.  93 people are employed in the secondary sector and there are 6 businesses in this sector.  74 people are employed in the tertiary sector, with 22 businesses in this sector.

 the mid year average unemployment rate was 1%.  There were 29 non-agrarian businesses in the municipality and 57% of the (non-agrarian) population was involved in the secondary sector of the economy while 43% were involved in the third.  At the same time, 67.1% of the working population was employed full-time, and 32.9% was employed part-time.  There were 158 residents of the municipality who were employed in some capacity, of which females made up 45.6% of the workforce.   there were 82 residents who worked in the municipality, while 162 residents worked outside Trasadingen and 75 people commuted into the municipality for work.

, there are 2 restaurants and the hospitality industry in Trasadingen employs 8 people.

References

Municipalities of the canton of Schaffhausen
Germany–Switzerland border crossings